Bayport-Blue Point Union-Free School District is a public school district that serves the hamlets of Bayport and Blue Point. It consists of Bayport-Blue Point High School, James Wilson Young Middle School, and three elementary schools: Academy  Street Elementary, Blue Point Elementary, and Sylvan Avenue Elementary.

History
Bayport-Blue Point School District was formed in 1959 by a merger of Bayport School District (Founded 1927 and based out of what is now Bayport-Blue Point High School) and Blue Point School District (Founded 1929 and based out of what is now Blue Point Elementary School).

2003 Bond Referendum
During the 2002–2003 school year, residents passed a $35 million bond referendum giving improvements to schools across the district. Construction began during the 2003–2004 school year, and was completed in time for the 2006–2007 school year. The improvements included a brand-new auditorium, a new front entrance, 10 brand-new classrooms, and renovation/expansion of the gymnasium at Bayport-Blue Point High School. Also included in the bond were a cafeteria and 6-classroom addition at Academy Street Elementary, and a library wing at Blue Point Elementary.

2015 Bond Referendum
During the 2014-2015 school year, residents passed another bond referendum, this time worth $30 million for additional upgrades. The largest items in the bond included two new turf athletic fields at the high school, renovation, repavement, and expansion of the shared parking lot and driveways at the middle school and Sylan Avenue Elementary, restoration of the slate roof at Blue Point Elementary, new sporting facilities at the middle school, and renovations to the library and science classrooms at both the middle school and high school. Construction began during the 2015-2016 school year and was completed in time for the 2019-2020 school year.

References

External links
Yearbooks

School districts in New York (state)
Education in Suffolk County, New York